The term class council is derived from the classroom assembly ("Réunion coopérative", "Conseil") of Freinet pedagogy.
Freinet did organize the class like an (agricultural) cooperative society.
Much like the farmers organize cultivation and marketing of their products together in a cooperative the pupils plan and organize learning themselves.
The class council is an agency of self-determination in which all pupils participate with equal rights.

An alternative model of the class council is based on work of Rudolf Dreikurs, a pupil of Alfred Adler.
Dreikurs developed the class council based on individual psychology and without reference to Freinet pedagogy as an instrument of problem solving and mediation but not as an agency of self-determination.

In Freinet pedagogy

Tasks and fields of activity 
The class council can:                               
          
 deliberate on excursions.
 deliberate on teaching methods.
 deliberate on subject matter.

 The intent is to promote a sense of community, community spirit and a democratic attitude. Communicative competencies and independent study skills are also meant to benefit.

In the class council pupils can

 present self-determined learning projects and tasks which are useful to run a democratic class council.
 decide on cooperations.
 formulate missions and requests to working groups.
 present and discuss learning results.
 plan the social life of the class.
 plan the expenses of the class.
 discuss relations and problems with other classes.
 discuss issues of self-determination.

Valuable class institution 

The class council is a means to promote citizenship education. The individual learning goals and the social interests of the pupils are the focus of the class council. The self-determination of the class includes economic experience as excursions, common property and consumption items require funding.
 
Differences between curricular educational objectives and individual learning goals of the pupils may lead to a conflict of interests for the teacher and the class. Experiences in class councils have shown that pupils are eager to follow extra-curricular learning objectives.

Administration of a class council 

During the introduction stage the class teacher can perform the necessary administratory tasks.
In a later stage the pupils can rotate the offices of chairman, keeper of the minutes, rule monitor, time monitor and other tasks.
The pupils can also determine the agenda.

Agenda 

The agenda for a meeting of the class council can be prepared by pupils. A useful means is a bulletin board/wall newspaper that is used to collect contributions in different categories (e.g. criticism, appreciation, proposals). All pupils in a class can make contributions to the bulletin board.

Role of the teacher during the class council 

The teacher is meant to actively reduce his influence and to allow for democratic and social processes in the group.
A class left to its own devices may run the risk of encouraging oligarchs.
A successful instrument of self-determination supposedly develops best with the support of the teacher in the role of an advisor.

Rules 

The self-given rules of the class council should  suffice as long as they are not in contradiction with school policy or the law.
Prearranged rules may be helpful but undermine the self-determination of the pupils.
The view what constitutes an orderly class council may be quite different for pupils and for teachers.
Pupils need scope for development and the chance to make their own experiences by experimenting with and inventing their own democratic behaviors and rules.

Criticism on contemporary class councils from the perspective of Freinet pedagogy 

The class council today is often removed from its pedagogical context in Freinet pedagogy and is modified and reduced. Freinet pedagogues criticize that the class council loses its democratic and emancipatory aspects and becomes an extension of class teacher and school administration.
Even in the democratic toolkit building blocks of the BLK the class council is primarily a means for problem solving.

References

See also 

 Student council

Education reform
School terminology
Pedagogy
Student politics